Out may refer to:

Arts, entertainment, and media

Films
Out (1957 film), a documentary short about the Hungarian Revolution of 1956
Out (1982 film), an American film directed by Eli Hollander
Out (2002 film), a Japanese film based on the novel by Natsuo Kirino and directed by Hideyuki Hirayama
Out (2013 film), a Canadian short comedy film directed by Jeremy LaLonde
Out (2017 film), a Slovak film directed by György Kristóf
Out (2020 film), an American animated film produced by Pixar

Music
Out (jazz) or outside, an approach to jazz improvisation
OUT, a band produced by Adam Walton
OUT, a 1994 album by Nav Katze
Out (In Essence), a 1991 album by Fluke

Television
Out (miniseries), a 1978 British television crime drama starring Tom Bell
"Out" (Dark Angel), a television episode

Other uses in arts, entertainment, and media
Out (magazine), an LGBT fashion, entertainment, and lifestyle magazine
Out (novel), a 1997 novel by Natsuo Kirino
OUTeverywhere, a community website for LGBT people around the world

Sports and recreation
Out (baseball), a play which retires the batter or a base runner
Out (cricket), the loss of a wicket by a batsman; also known as "dismissal"
Out (poker), an unseen card which is expected to win a hand, if drawn
Out (route), a pattern run by a receiver in American football

Sexuality
Coming out, publicly revealing one's own LGBT status
Outing, publicly revealing someone else's LGBT status

Mathematics
Out(Fn), the outer automorphism group of a free group on n generators
Outer automorphism group, a quotient Out(G) of the automorphism group

Transport
Outwood railway station, West Yorkshire, National Rail station code

Other uses
Out, a procedure word in voice radio communication

See also
 Outing (disambiguation)
 Outside (disambiguation)